Gustavo Kuerten defeated Marat Safin in the final, 6–4, 5–7, 6–4, 5–7, 7–6(7–3) to win the singles tennis title at the 2000 Hamburg European Open.

Marcelo Ríos was the defending champion, but was defeated in the semifinals by Safin.

Seeds 
A champion seed is indicated in bold text while text in italics indicates the round in which that seed was eliminated.

  Pete Sampras (second round)
  Yevgeny Kafelnikov (first round)
  Magnus Norman (quarterfinals)
  Cédric Pioline (quarterfinals)
  Gustavo Kuerten (champion)
  Nicolás Lapentti (first round)
  Thomas Enqvist (second round)
  Tim Henman (third round)
  Álex Corretja (third round)
  Lleyton Hewitt (second round)
  Patrick Rafter (first round)
  Marat Safin (final)
  Younes El Aynaoui (third round)
  Dominik Hrbatý (first round)
  Juan Carlos Ferrero (second round)
  Tommy Haas (first round)

Draw

Finals

Top half

Section 1

Section 2

Bottom half

Section 3

Section 4

External links 
 Main draw

Singles